Brian Cook (born July 16, 1977) is an American bass guitarist currently in the bands Russian Circles and Sumac. He was also previously a full-time member of Botch, These Arms Are Snakes and Roy, and also a session musician for Mouth of the Architect. Cook is also a freelance journalist and has published a book titled The Second Chair is Meant for You. He is openly gay.

In August 2021, Cook released his first solo album titled We Left a Note with an Apology through Sargent House under the moniker Torment & Glory. The initial concept for the album dates back to the mid-2000's when he listened to Bruce Springsteen's 1982 studio album Nebraska on vinyl that was so covered in dust, the music was heavily distorted with occasional acoustic guitar music.

Discography

As official member

Botch
 The Unifying Themes of Sex, Death and Religion (compilation) (1997)
 American Nervoso (1998)
 We Are the Romans (1999)
 An Anthology of Dead Ends (EP) (2002)
 061502 (live album) (2006)

Onalaska
 To Sing for Nights (2002)

Roy
 Tacomatose (EP) (2003)
 Big City Sin and Small Town Redemption (2004)
 Killed John Train (2006)

These Arms Are Snakes
 This Is Meant to Hurt You (EP) (2003)
 Oxeneers or the Lion Sleeps When Its Antelope Go Home (2004)
 Like a Virgin (2005)
 Easter (2006)
 Tail Swallower and Dove (2008)

Russian Circles
 Station (2008)
 Geneva (2009)
 Empros (2011)
 Memorial (2013)
 Guidance (2016)
 Blood Year (2019)
 Gnosis (2022)

Sumac
 The Deal (2015)
 What One Becomes (2016)
 American Dollar Bill – Keep Facing Sideways, You're Too Hideous to Look at Face On (2018)
 Love In Shadow (2018)
 Even for Just the Briefest Moment, Keep Charging This 'Expiation" Plug in to........Making it Slightly Better (2019)
 May You Be Held (2020)
 "Two Beasts" (single) (2020)

Torment & Glory
 We Left a Note with an Apology (2021)

As session member

Mouth of the Architect
 The Ties That Blind (2006)

Mamiffer
 Hirror Enniffer (2008)
 Mare Decendrii (2011)
 Bless Them That Curse You (2012)

New Idea Society
 "Now is Here" / "Wave Goodbye" (2019)

References

Living people
Musicians from Seattle
LGBT people from Washington (state)
American gay musicians
Guitarists from Washington (state)
American male bass guitarists
1977 births
21st-century American bass guitarists
21st-century American male musicians
20th-century American LGBT people
21st-century American LGBT people